The Apostolic Nunciature to Slovakia is an ecclesiastical office of the Catholic Church in Slovakia. It is a diplomatic post of the Holy See, whose representative is called the Apostolic Nuncio with the rank of an ambassador.

Apostolic Nuncios to Slovakia
Archbishop Giovanni Coppa was named Apostolic Nuncio to Czechoslovakia on 30 June 1990. With the division on that country into Slovakia and the Czech Republic on 1 January 1993, Coppa became nuncio to each of them, based in Prague.

Giovanni Coppa (1 January 1993 – 2 March 1994)
Luigi Dossena (2 March 1994  – 8 February 2001)
Henryk Józef Nowacki 8 February 2001 – 28 November 2007)
Mario Giordana (15 March 2008 – 1 April 2017)
Giacomo Guido Ottonello (1 April 2017 – 31 October 2021)
Nicola Girasoli (2 July 2022 – present)

See also
Apostolic Nunciature to the Czech Republic
Apostolic Nunciature to Czechoslovakia
Foreign relations of the Holy See
List of diplomatic missions of the Holy See

References

Slovakia
 
Holy See–Slovakia relations